Noel Punton (23 December 1931 – 11 December 2017) was an Australian gymnast. He competed in eight events at the 1956 Summer Olympics. His daughter is comedy writer and producer, short fiction author, and essayist Anita Punton, whose essay about her father placed second in the 2021 Calibre Essay Prize.

References

External links
 

1931 births
2017 deaths
Australian male artistic gymnasts
Olympic gymnasts of Australia
Gymnasts at the 1956 Summer Olympics
Place of birth missing